Álvaro Rodríguez Ros (16 January 1936 – 16 June 2018), commonly known as Alvarito, was a Spanish football defender and manager.

Club career
Alvarito was born in Ujo, Mieres. After playing for two clubs in his native Asturias, he joined the professionals in 1955, going on to spend two seasons in Segunda División with Real Oviedo also in his region of birth. In summer 1957, he joined La Liga side Atlético Madrid alongside teammate Toni Cuervo, also a fullback.

Cuervo returned to Oviedo shortly after a health problem halted his progression, but Alvarito stayed with Atlético, helping them to back-to-back Copa del Rey conquests, both won at the Santiago Bernabéu Stadium against Real Madrid. He never appeared in more than nine league games for the club during his six-year spell as no substitutions were allowed at that time, and often played understudy to Isacio Calleja; he also suffered a tibia and fibula injury, in a match against Real Valladolid.

Alvarito's last season in his country's top division would be 1963–64, playing the most he had in years to help Real Murcia finish in 12th position and scoring his first and only goal in the competition on 16 February 1964, in a 1–0 home win over former team Oviedo. Subsequently, he plied his trade in the Republic of Ireland, Canada and the United States – very briefly returning to Spain to appear for Córdoba CF – acting as player-coach for Shelbourne. He retired in 1970, at the age of 34.

Subsequently, Alvarito worked as a manager, never in higher than Segunda División B.

International career
Alvarito earned two caps for Spain in July 1960, in as many away friendlies: on the 14th, he made his debut in a 4–0 win against Chile. Ten days later, he appeared in a 0–2 loss with Argentina.

Death
Alvarito died on 16 June 2018 in Huércal-Overa, Province of Almería, at the age of 82.

Honours
Atlético Madrid
Copa del Generalísimo: 1959–60, 1960–61

References

External links

1936 births
2018 deaths
Footballers from Mieres, Asturias
Spanish footballers
Association football defenders
La Liga players
Segunda División players
Caudal Deportivo footballers
Real Oviedo players
Atlético Madrid footballers
Real Murcia players
Córdoba CF players
League of Ireland players
Shelbourne F.C. players
Vancouver Royals players
Spain B international footballers
Spain international footballers
Spanish expatriate footballers
Expatriate association footballers in the Republic of Ireland
Expatriate soccer players in Canada
Spanish football managers
Shelbourne F.C. managers
Segunda División B managers
UD Melilla managers
Spanish expatriate football managers